Dutch architecture has played an important role in the international discourse on architecture in three eras. The first of these was during the 17th century, when the Dutch empire was at the height of its power. The second was in the first half of the 20th century, during development of modernism. The third is not concluded and involves many contemporary Dutch architects who are achieving global prestige.

Examples

Renaissance and Baroque

The Dutch Golden Age roughly spanned the 17th century. Due to the thriving economy, cities expanded greatly. New town halls and storehouses were built, and many new canals were dug out in and around various cities such as Delft, Leiden and Amsterdam for defence and transport purposes. Many wealthy merchants had a new houses built along these canals. These houses were generally very narrow and had ornamented façades that befitted their new status. In the countryside, new country houses were built, though not in the same numbers.

Of Italian Renaissance architecture, primarily visual characteristics such as pillars, pilasters, pediments and rustication were adopted, since many Dutch architects were unable to read the theoretical substantiation, which was often written down in Italian or Latin. Horizontal lines were emphasised, contrasting with the vertical emphasis of Gothic architecture. For instance, light-coloured bands were embedded into facades to emphasise this horizontal character. Another common application in Dutch Renaissance architecture, particularly in Amsterdam, was the stepped gable, which was meant to hide the diagonal lines of the gable behind the straight lines of the façade.

The architecture of the first republic in Northern Europe was marked by sobriety and restraint, and was meant to reflect democratic values by quoting extensively from classical antiquity. It found its impetus in the designs of Hendrick de Keyser, who was instrumental in establishing a Venetian-influenced style into early 17th-century architecture through new buildings like the Noorderkerk ("Northern church", 1620–1623) and Westerkerk ("Western church", 1620–1631) in Amsterdam. In general, architecture in the Low Countries, both in the Counter-Reformation-influenced south and Protestant-dominated north, remained strongly invested in northern Italian Renaissance and Mannerist forms that predated the Roman High Baroque style of Borromini and Bernini. Instead, the more austere form practiced in the Dutch Republic was well suited to major building patterns: palaces for the House of Orange and new civic buildings, uninfluenced by the Counter-Reformation style that made some headway in Antwerp.

The major exponents of the mid-17th century, Jacob van Campen and Pieter Post, adopted de Keyser's forms for such eclectic elements as giant-order pilasters, gable roofs, central pediments, and vigorous steeples. Brought together in a coherent combination, these stylistic developments anticipated Wren's Classicism. The most ambitious constructions of the period included the seats of self-government in Amsterdam (1646) and Maastricht (1658), designed by Campen and Post, respectively. On the other hand, the residences of the House of Orange are closer to a typical burgher mansion than to a royal palace. Two of these, Huis ten Bosch and Mauritshuis, are symmetrical blocks with large windows, stripped of ostentatious Baroque flourishes. The same austerely geometrical effect is achieved without great cost or pretentious effects at the stadholder's summer residence of Het Loo.

Another of the designs used by the Dutch was the use of warm colors such as red or dark orange. They also were roughly textured and had tended to be darkened due to the rough texturing. The use of architectural symmetrical balance was part of their habits as well.

Modernism

During the 20th century, Dutch architects like Berlage, Van Doesburg, Van Eesteren, Rietveld, Oud and Van der Vlugt played a leading role in the development of modern architecture. Out of the early 20th century Rationalist architecture of Berlage, architect of the Beurs van Berlage, separate groups developed during the 1920s, each with their own view on which direction modern architecture should take. Expressionist architects like Michel de Klerk and Piet Kramer were associated with Amsterdam (see Amsterdam School). Another group consisted of more functionalist architects (Nieuwe Zakelijkheid or Nieuwe Bouwen), such as Mart Stam, Leendert van der Vlugt, and Johannes Duiker, who had good ties with the international modernist group CIAM. A third group came out of the De Stijl movement, among them J.J.P. Oud and Gerrit Rietveld. Both architects later built in a functionalist style.

A 1918 reaction to Dutch functionalist architecture was the Traditionalist School, which lasted until well after 1945.

Dutch colonial architecture

See also
Cape Dutch architecture
Colonial architecture of Indonesia
Dutch colonial architecture
List of protected buildings in Sint Eustatius

References

External links
 Architectureguide.nl, Online guide to Modern Architecture in The Netherlands